The Himalayan country named Nepala with its capital in Kathmandu Valley was well-known in the Indian sub-continent by at least 2,500 years ago. Historical discussions on the etymology of Nepal incorporated elements of Hindu and Buddhist myths; these legends are not considered academically credible. The origin of the term Nepal is an area of ongoing investigation. Multiple hypotheses have been put forward by modern scholars to varying level of support. It is generally accepted that Nepal and Newar—the latter refers to the ethnic group indigenous to the Kathmandu Valley—are different forms of the same word.

Etymology of Nepal
The precise origin of the term Nepāl is uncertain. Academic attempts to provide a plausible theory are hindered by the lack of a complete picture of history, and insufficient understanding of linguistics or relevant Indo-European and Tibeto-Burman languages.

According to Hindu mythology, Nepal derives its name from an ancient Hindu sage called Ne, referred to variously as Ne Muni or Nemi. According to Pashupati Purana, as a place protected by Ne, the country in the heart of the Himalayas came to be known as Nepal. The word pala in Pali language means to protect. Consequently, Nepala translates to protected by Ne. According to Nepal Mahatmya, of 30 chapters about the Nepal Tirtha (pilgrimage) region, a regional text that claims to be a part of the Skanda Purana, the largest Mahāpurāṇa, Nemi was charged with protection of the country by Pashupati.

According to Buddhist mythology, Manjushri Bodhisattva drained a primordial lake of serpents to create the Nepal valley and proclaimed that Adi-Buddha Ne would take care of the community that would settle it. As the cherished of Ne, the valley would be called Nepal.

According to Gopalarajvamshavali, the genealogy of ancient Gopala dynasty compiled circa 1380s, Nepal is named after Nepa the cowherd, the founder of the Nepali scion of the Abhiras. In this account, the cow that issued milk to the spot, at which Nepa discovered the Jyotirlinga of Pashupatinath upon investigation, was also named Ne.

Norwegian Indologist Christian Lassen had proposed that Nepala was a compound of Nipa (foot of a mountain) and -ala (short suffix for alaya meaning abode), and so Nepala meant "abode at the foot of the mountain". He considered Ne Muni to be a fabrication. Indologist Sylvain Levi found Lassen's theory untenable but had no theories of his own, only suggesting that either Newara is a vulgarism of sanskritic Nepala, or Nepala is Sanskritisation of the local ethnic; his view has found some support though it does not answer the question of etymology. It has also been proposed that Nepa is a Tibeto-Burman stem consisting of Ne (cattle) and Pa (keeper), reflecting the fact that early inhabitants of the valley were Gopalas (cowherds) and Mahispalas (buffalo-herds). Suniti Kumar Chatterji thought Nepal originated from Tibeto-Burman roots- Ne, of uncertain meaning (as multiple possibilities exist), and pala or bal, whose meaning is lost entirely.

History
The Mahabharata refers to Nepal as Kiratadesa, literally "the country of Kiratas", providing no other clue as to the location or extent of the country. Aside from that, ancient texts mention only of the people, the Kiratas, inhabiting the northern frontier of the Indian sub-continent, often associating them with the Chinese. These include the Rigveda, Ramayana, Manusmriti, the Chinese text P'ou-Yeo king (translated in 308) which refers to them by the name "Yi-Ti-Sai" (barbarians to the north), and the writings of Periplus and Ptolemy, both of whom place the Kirata country at the mouth of the Ganges.

Kautilya's is the first known writing to mention the country by the name Nepala. Since then, Nepala has continually referred to the Himalayan country with its capital in the Kathmandu Valley, though its extent fluctuated throughout history.

Names of modern Nepal
In its early days after unification, Nepal was known as the "Gorkha kingdom" or "Gorkha empire", having been founded by conquests of the Gorkha kingdom. In his Dibyopadesh, Prithvi Narayan Shah proclaimed Nepal "Asal Hindustan", or the true land of the Hindus, as a Hindu state which had not been conquered by the Mughals or the British.

As a monarchy, Nepal was officially the "Kingdom of Nepal". After the 2006 revolution, Nepal shed off the monarchy to become the "State of Nepal". It officially became the "Federal Democratic Republic of Nepal" with the promulgation of the new constitution in 2015.

References 

Country name etymology
History of Nepal